Liudmila Sergeyevna Belavenets (also transliterated Lyudmila Sergeevna Belavenets; 7 June 1940 – 7 November 2021) was a Russian chess player.

Biography
Born in Moscow, she was the daughter of Russian chess master Sergey Belavenets.

In correspondence chess, Belavenets was the fourth women's world champion (1984–1992) and was awarded the titles of Lady Grandmaster and International Master in 1991. In over-the-board chess, she won the Women's Soviet Chess Championship in 1975 and was awarded the title of Woman International Master by FIDE in 1977. In 2010, she was awarded also the title of FIDE Senior Trainer.

Death
Belavenets died from COVID-19 in Moscow on 7 November 2021, at age 81, amid the COVID-19 pandemic in Russia.

References

External links
 
 
 
 Interview (2011) by ChessPro (in Russian)

1940 births
2021 deaths
Russian female chess players
Soviet female chess players
Chess Woman International Masters
Jewish chess players
Chess coaches
Russian Jews
Sportspeople from Moscow
World Correspondence Chess Champions
Deaths from the COVID-19 pandemic in Russia